Muhain Khalifah (Arabic:محين خليفة) (born 10 June 1994) is an Emirati footballer who plays for Al Urooba on loan from Ittihad Kalba as a midfielder, most recently for Al-Sharjah.

External links

References

Emirati footballers
1994 births
Living people
Sharjah FC players
Al-Ittihad Kalba SC players
Al Urooba Club players
UAE First Division League players
UAE Pro League players
Association football midfielders